The 2015 Scottish Challenge Cup final, also known as the Petrofac Training Cup final for sponsorship reasons, was a football match that took place at McDiarmid Park on 5 April 2015, between Livingston and Alloa Athletic. The match was televised by BBC ALBA. It was the 24th final of the Scottish Challenge Cup since it was first organised in 1990 to celebrate the centenary of the now defunct Scottish Football League, it is the second Challenge Cup Final since the SPFL was formed. Both teams progressed through four elimination rounds to reach the final.

Route to the final

The competition is a knock-out tournament and in 2014–15 was contested by 32 teams. Those participating were the 30 clubs that played in the Championship, League One and League Two of the Scottish Professional Football League, while the winners of the Highland League (Brora Rangers) and the Lowland Football League (Spartans) were also invited. For the first and second rounds only, the draw was divided into two geographical regions – north/east and south/west. Teams were paired at random and the winner of each match progressed to the next round and the loser was eliminated.

Livingston

Alloa Athletic

Match details

References

Scottish Challenge Cup Finals
Scottish Challenge Cup Final 2015
Scottish Challenge Cup Final 2015
Challenge Cup Final
3
Sport in Perth, Scotland